was a Japanese-French yōga painter.

Born in Ohara Village (present day Itako), Ibaraki Prefecture, Murayama started to study watercolor painting under Susumu Kobori. After moving to Tokyo, he enrolled at the private .

In the latter half of the 1950s, he moved to France, the citizenship of which he acquired in 1981.

Awards
Prix Charles de Gaulle (1962).
Médaille d'honneur du travail (vermeil) and Honorary citizen of Paris (1991)
Honorary citizen of Itako, Ibarako Prefecture, Japan (1991)
Grande Medaille d'Or of the Académie des Beaux-Arts (1995)
Special Award for People of Merit of Ibaraki Prefecture (1996)
Chevalier (knight) of the Legion of Honour (1997)

References

Biography at Itako City official website 
Interview in France News Digest 

1918 births
2013 deaths
Japanese painters
French painters
Chevaliers of the Légion d'honneur